Gérard Adrianus Pius de Kort (born 11 September 1963) is a retired butterfly swimmer from the Netherlands. He competed at the 1984 Olympics in the individual 100 m and 200 m events, but failed to reach the finals.

References

1963 births
Living people
Dutch male butterfly swimmers
Olympic swimmers of the Netherlands
Swimmers at the 1984 Summer Olympics
Sportspeople from Leiden